Fintry Castle, was a 15th-century castle near Fintry, Stirling, Scotland. The castle was built on the northern slopes of the valley of the Endrick Water.

The estate of Fintray was granted in 1460 to Sir Robert Graham of Balargus by Patrick, Lord Graham. The castle replaced the earlier motte and bailey castle of Fintray.

References

Castles in Stirling (council area)
Clan Graham